Abul Faraj Runi, born in Lahore, was an 11th-century Persian court poet who wrote Mathnawi. His family came from Nishapur in Khorasan. He was a contemporary of Masud Sa'ad Salman. 

He died at the turn of the 11th-12th century.

References used
 E.G. Browne. Literary History of Persia. (Four volumes, 2,256 pages, and twenty-five years in the writing). 1998. 
 Jan Rypka, History of Iranian Literature. Reidel Publishing Company. ASIN B-000-6BXVT-K

See also

List of Persian poets and authors

11th-century Persian-language poets
12th-century Persian-language poets
Year of birth unknown
Year of death unknown
Poets from Nishapur
Poets from the Seljuk Empire
11th-century Iranian people
12th-century Iranian people
People from Lahore